The 2021 Rolex Paris Masters was a professional tennis tournament played on indoor hard courts. It was the 49th edition of the tournament, and a Masters 1000 event on the 2021 ATP Tour. It was held at the Palais omnisports de Paris-Bercy in Paris, France, between 1 and 7 November 2021.

Champions

Singles

  Novak Djokovic def.  Daniil Medvedev, 4–6, 6–3, 6–3.
Djokovic won his record 37th ATP Tour Masters 1000 title.

Doubles

  Tim Pütz /  Michael Venus def.  Pierre-Hugues Herbert /  Nicolas Mahut, 6–3, 6–7(4–7), [11–9]

Points and prize money

Point distribution

Prize money

*per team

Singles main-draw entrants

Seeds
The following are the seeded players. Seedings are based on ATP rankings as of October 25, 2021. Rank and points before are as of November 1, 2021.

Because the 2020 tournament was non-mandatory, players are defending points from that tournament only if they counted towards their 19 best results as of November 1, 2021. Points from the 2019 tournament were dropped on November 1, 2021, and are accordingly not shown separately in the table.

Points from the ATP Finals (the greater of the 2019 and 2020 editions) will also be dropped at the end of the tournament. These points will not be replaced by other results.

† The player is not defending points from the 2020 tournament. Accordingly, his 19th best result is shown in this column instead.
^ Because the 2021 tournament is non-mandatory, the player substituted his 19th best result in place of the points won in this tournament.

Other entrants
The following players received wild cards into the main singles draw:
  Richard Gasquet
  Pierre-Hugues Herbert
  Andy Murray
  Arthur Rinderknech

The following players received entry from the singles qualifying draw:
  Jenson Brooksby
  Hugo Gaston 
  Marcos Giron 
  Miomir Kecmanović 
  Gianluca Mager 
  Tommy Paul 
  Mikael Ymer

The following players received entry as lucky losers:
  Dominik Koepfer
  Lorenzo Musetti
  Alexei Popyrin

Withdrawals
Before the tournament
  Matteo Berrettini → replaced by  Lorenzo Musetti
  Roger Federer → replaced by  Albert Ramos Viñolas
  Cristian Garín → replaced by  Adrian Mannarino
  David Goffin → replaced by  Frances Tiafoe
  Lloyd Harris → replaced by  Alexei Popyrin
  Ugo Humbert → replaced by  John Millman
  John Isner → replaced by  James Duckworth
  Rafael Nadal → replaced by  Ilya Ivashka
  Milos Raonic → replaced by  Benoît Paire
  Denis Shapovalov → replaced by  Mackenzie McDonald
  Dominic Thiem → replaced by  Laslo Đere

 During the tournament 
  Jenson Brooksby → replaced by  Dominik Koepfer

Doubles main-draw entrants

Seeds

 1 Rankings are as of 25 October 2021

Other entrants
The following pairs received wildcards into the doubles main draw:
  Benjamin Bonzi /  Arthur Rinderknech
  Novak Djokovic /  Filip Krajinović

The following pairs received entry as alternates:
  Roberto Bautista Agut /  Alexander Bublik
  Santiago González /  Andrés Molteni

Withdrawals
Before the tournament
  Félix Auger-Aliassime /  Hubert Hurkacz → replaced by  Andrey Golubev /  Aslan Karatsev
  Cristian Garín /  Santiago González → replaced by  Fabio Fognini /  Lorenzo Sonego
  Marcel Granollers /  Horacio Zeballos → replaced by  Roberto Bautista Agut /  Alexander Bublik
  Karen Khachanov /  Andrey Rublev →  Santiago González /  Andrés Molteni

References

External links
 
 ATP tournament profile